Charlotte Köhler Prize is a Dutch incentive award given to young talent (under the age of 35) in visual arts and theatre.

The prizes, €30,000 each, were established in 1988 in honour of the actress  and is annually given by the Prins Bernhard Cultuurfonds.

Award winners (selected)

 Wiel Arets, 1988
 Berend Strik, 1990
 Ben van Berkel, 1991
 Joep van Lieshout, 1991
 Q.S. Serafijn, 1992
 Ben Zegers, 1994
 Job Koelewijn, 1996
 Barbara Visser (artist), 1996
 Yael Davids, 1997
 Guido Geelen, 2000
 Marc Bijl, 2004
 Michel van der Aa, 2005
 Pere Faura, 2009
 Florian Idenburg, 2010
 Daan Roosegaarde, 2012
 Anouk Kruithof, 2014
 , 2017
 Manon Uphoff, 2020

See also

 List of European art awards

References

Dutch art awards